Uvularia floridana, the Florida bellwort,  is a plant species native to the US states of Florida, Georgia, Alabama, Mississippi, and South Carolina. It grows in rich hardwood forests at elevations less than 100 m.

Uvularia floridana is a perennial herb spreading by means of underground rhizomes. It has one pale yellow flower per stem.

References

External links
 Native and Naturalized plants of Florida, Uvularia floridana

floridana
Flora of Florida
Flora of Georgia (U.S. state)
Flora of Alabama
Flora of South Carolina
Plants described in 1860
Taxa named by Alvan Wentworth Chapman